E. roseus may refer to:
 Eleutherodactylus roseus, a frog species endemic to Colombia
 Eupsophus roseus, a frog species endemic to Chile

See also
 Roseus (disambiguation)